Graffiti Tongue is a solo album by Irish folk singer Christy Moore, released in 1996.

Track listing
 "Yellow Triangle"
 "God Woman"
 "Minds Locked Shut"
 "Folk Tale"
 "Riding the High Stool"
 "Tiles and Slabs"
 "Strange Ways"
 "On the Mainland"
 "Boning Halls"
 "Miracles of Nature"
 "North and South of the River"
 "Rory Is Gone"

Personnel
Christy Moore – guitar, bodhran, vocals

References

External links
The Christy Moore website

Christy Moore albums
1996 albums